The Canon SX280 HS compact camera, is a compact zoom camera created by Canon. While the camera does have a very impressive spec sheet, it has a very good zoom at 20X, and it also has GPS and it records in a crisp clear full HD video.

Specifications
Focal Length 	4.5 – 90.0 mm (35 mm equivalent: 25 – 500 mm)	
Zoom 	Optical 20x
ZoomPlus 40x
Digital Approx. 4.0x (with Digital Tele-Converter Approx. 1.5x or 2.0x and Safety Zoom¹). Combined Approx. 80x	
Maximum f/number 	f/3.5 – f/6.8	
Construction 	12 elements in 10 groups (1 UD lens, 2 double-sided aspherical lens)	
Image Stabilisation 	Yes (lens shift-type), Approx. 2.5-stop¹. Intelligent IS.

References

SX280 HS